The Ziya River is one of the five major tributaries of Hai River system in northern China. The discharge rate of Ziya River is about 1 m3/s. 

The Ziya River flows from Mount Wutai until it reaches the Hai River near Xian County. Notable tributaries of the Ziya include the Ming, the Hutuo, the Fuyang, and the Qingshui. It shares the same channel with the Hai near the Southern Canal. A new artificial channel was constructed to connect it to Bohai Sea near Tianjin under the name New Ziya River.

References

Rivers of Hebei
Rivers of Shanxi